Koffi Blaise Kouassi (born 2 February 1975) is an Ivorian former professional footballer, who played as a defender. He works as assistant manager of the Ivory Coast national football team.

Club career
Kouassi was born in Abidjan. He previously played for ASEC Mimosas in his homeland, in France for En Avant Guingamp, Troyes AC in Ligue 1, Angers in the Ligue 2 and for Al-Rayyan in Qatar.

International career
He earned 37 caps for the national team, and was called up to the 2006 World Cup.

Coaching career
On 28 May 2010, Kouassi was named as the new assistant manager of the Ivory Coast national football team.

Honors
Ivory Coast
Africa Cup of Nations runner-up:2006

References

External links
 

1975 births
Living people
Footballers from Abidjan
Association football defenders
Ivorian footballers
Ivory Coast international footballers
Ivorian expatriate footballers
Expatriate footballers in France
Expatriate footballers in Qatar
Ligue 1 players
Ligue 2 players
ASEC Mimosas players
En Avant Guingamp players
ES Troyes AC players
Angers SCO players
Al-Rayyan SC players
2006 FIFA World Cup players
1998 African Cup of Nations players
2000 African Cup of Nations players
2002 African Cup of Nations players
2006 Africa Cup of Nations players